The Genesee Group is a geologic formation in Pennsylvania. It preserves fossils dating back to the Devonian period.

It includes submembers:
 West River Shale
 Genundewa Limestone
 Penn Yan Formation
 Geneseo Shale
 North Evans Limestone

See also

 List of fossiliferous stratigraphic units in Pennsylvania
 Paleontology in Pennsylvania

References

 
 

Geologic groups of Pennsylvania